Flytrap may refer to:

 A fly-killing device
 Venus flytrap, a carnivorous plant
 Flytrap (Whitecross album), 1996
 Flytrap (CJ Fly album), 2016